The Pittsburgh Plate Glass Company Building, also known as the Northern Implement Company and the American Trio Building, is a warehouse building in downtown Minneapolis, Minnesota.  PPG Industries of Pittsburgh constructed the structure.

Background
It was designed by the architectural firm Kees and Colburn and shows strong influences of architect Louis Sullivan.  The arches in the top floor windows are modeled after Louis Sullivan's designs, which in turn were influenced by Henry Hobson Richardson's Richardsonian Romanesque style.  The corners of the building are subtly chamfered in at the bottom and rise toward a flaring cornice at the top, echoing John Wellborn Root's design of the Monadnock Building in Chicago.

The building has now been converted to loft apartments.

References

National Register of Historic Places in Minneapolis
Commercial buildings completed in 1910
Warehouses on the National Register of Historic Places
Commercial buildings on the National Register of Historic Places in Minnesota
PPG Industries